Dieudonné Jamar (born 6 November 1878, date of death unknown) was a Belgian racing cyclist. He won the Belgian national road race title in 1905.

References

External links

1878 births
Year of death missing
Belgian male cyclists
Sportspeople from Liège
Cyclists from Liège Province